Amos Omolo (born 9 March 1937) is a Ugandan sprinter. He competed in the men's 100 metres at the 1968 Summer Olympics. He won a bronze medal at the 440 yards at the 1962 British Empire and Commonwealth Games.

References

1937 births
Living people
Athletes (track and field) at the 1964 Summer Olympics
Athletes (track and field) at the 1968 Summer Olympics
Ugandan male sprinters
Olympic athletes of Uganda
Athletes (track and field) at the 1962 British Empire and Commonwealth Games
Athletes (track and field) at the 1966 British Empire and Commonwealth Games
Athletes (track and field) at the 1970 British Commonwealth Games
Commonwealth Games bronze medallists for Uganda
Commonwealth Games medallists in athletics
Place of birth missing (living people)
Medallists at the 1962 British Empire and Commonwealth Games